This is a list of Arizona Coyotes award winners.  It also includes players and data from the previous incarnation of the franchise, the original Winnipeg Jets (1972–96).

League awards

Team trophies
The Arizona Coyotes have not won any of the team trophies the National Hockey League (NHL) awards annually — the Stanley Cup as league champions, the Clarence S. Campbell Bowl as Western Conference playoff champions and the Presidents' Trophy as the team with the most regular season points.

Individual awards

All-Stars

WHA First, Second and Third Team All-Stars

NHL first and second team All-Stars
The NHL first and second team All-Stars are the top players at each position as voted on by the Professional Hockey Writers' Association.

NHL All-Rookie Team
The NHL All-Rookie Team consists of the top rookies at each position as voted on by the Professional Hockey Writers' Association.

All-Star Game selections
The National Hockey League All-Star Game is a mid-season exhibition game held annually between many of the top players of each season. Thirty-three All-Star Games have been held since the Arizona Coyotes entered the NHL as the Winnipeg Jets in 1979, with at least one player chosen to represent the Coyotes in each year except 2003. The All-Star game has not been held in various years: 1979 and 1987 due to the 1979 Challenge Cup and Rendez-vous '87 series between the NHL and the Soviet national team, respectively, 1995, 2005, and 2013 as a result of labor stoppages, 2006, 2010, and 2014 because of the Winter Olympic Games, and 2021 as a result of the COVID-19 pandemic. The franchise has yet to host one of the games.

 Selected by fan vote
 Selected by Commissioner
 All-Star Game Most Valuable Player

All-Star Game replacement events

Career achievements

Hockey Hall of Fame
The following is a list of Arizona Coyotes who have been enshrined in the Hockey Hall of Fame.

Lester Patrick Trophy
The Lester Patrick Trophy has been presented by the National Hockey League and USA Hockey since 1966 to honor a recipient's contribution to ice hockey in the United States. This list includes all personnel who have ever been employed by the Arizona Coyotes in any capacity and have also received the Lester Patrick Trophy.

United States Hockey Hall of Fame

Retired numbers

The Arizona Coyotes have retired one of their jersey numbers. Bobby Hull's number 9 (February 19, 1989) and Thomas Steen's number 25 (May 6, 1995) were retired while the franchise was in Winnipeg. Hull's number was un-retired by his request prior to the 2005–06 season so his son Brett could wear it. Both numbers were returned to circulation during the 2014–15 season. Also out of circulation is the number 99 which was retired league-wide for Wayne Gretzky on February 6, 2000. Gretzky did not play for the Coyotes franchise during his 20-year NHL career and the only player in franchise history to wear the number prior to its league-wide retirement was Rick Dudley during the 1980–81 season.

Coyotes' Ring of Honor
Seven numbers are honored via the induction of players into the Coyotes' Ring of Honor. Bobby Hull and Wayne Gretzky, then entering his first season as head coach of the Coyotes, were the first two players inducted into the Coyotes' Ring of Honor on October 8, 2005.

Team awards

Jukka Nieminen Memorial Trophy
The Jukka Nieminen Memorial Trophy is an annual award given to the hardest working player as determined by the fans.

Leading Scorer Award
The Leading Scorer Award is an annual award given to the team's leading scorer during the regular season.

Man of the Year Award
The Man of the Year Award is an annual award given for a player's "dedication, commitment and passion for bettering the lives of those in the community."

Team MVP Award
The Team MVP Award is an annual award given to the team's Most Valuable Player as determined by Coyotes broadcast media and beat writers from The Arizona Republic and FoxSportsArizona.com.

Three-Star Award
The Three-Star Award is an annual award given to the player who earns the most points from Star of the game selections throughout the regular season.

Defunct team awards

Beth Champie Memorial Award
The Beth Champie Memorial Award was an annual award given to the player "who demonstrates the most dedication to the fans throughout the season." It was last awarded in 2011.

See also
List of National Hockey League awards

Notes

References

Arizona Coyotes
award